The Library of Contemporary History (German: Bibliothek für Zeitgeschichte) is one of Europe's largest special libraries for contemporary history, in Stuttgart, Germany.

History 

The library was founded in 1915 in Berlin by coffee substitute entrepreneur Richard Frank as a private collection. Its purpose was to document the First World War by collecting unconventional media like leaflets, posters and brochures. After the war, the collection moved to Schloss Rosenstein in Stuttgart and was opened as Weltkriegsbücherei to the public in 1921. In September 1944, the library (in Rosenstein Castle) was almost completely destroyed in an Allied air raid on Stuttgart.

In 1948 the Weltkriegsbücherei was renamed Bibliothek für Zeitgeschichte, short BfZ. The library moved into the new building of the Württembergische Landesbibliothek in 1951. After being an independent institution for several decades it finally became a department of the Württemberg State Library in 2000.

The library's collection focuses on military history, as well as civil wars, the history of genocide and state terrorism, foreign affairs, security policy, and peace and conflict studies. The collection currently consists of more than 400,000 books and 480 subscribed journals.

It published numerous publications and organizes regular public lectures. The library organizes a series of lectures on topics of contemporary history. Since January 2020, the lectures have been recorded in cooperation with the Gerda Henkel Stiftung and made available on the online portal L.I.S.A..

Special collections
The collection of books and periodicals is complemented by three special collections:
Zeit der Weltkriege (Era of World Wars from 1914 to 1945) includes photographs, posters, leaflets, and archives of personal-documents such as memoirs, diaries, and letters from combatants and civilians of both World Wars.
 Marine (Naval Archive) comprises a collection of around 500,000 photographs of warships and merchant ships from all over the world between 1850 and 1990, as well as a collection of naval history with marine charts, construction drawings, blueprints and text documents (torpedo reports, war diaries, manuscripts, etc.).
Neue Soziale Bewegungen (New Social Movements) focuses on the domestic political disputes in the Federal Republic of Germany since the 1960s (including student movement, peace movement, anti nuclear movement). The collection comprises the so-called grey literature (journals, brochures, leaflets) as well as posters.

Own editions 
 Schriften der Bibliothek für Zeitgeschichte / First series Volume 1.1962 – 28.1990; 
 Schriften der Bibliothek für Zeitgeschichte / Second series Volume 1.1993 – 27.2013
 Chronology of the War at Sea: 1939–1945 / Jürgen Rohwer ; Gerhard Hümmelchen. – 3. rev.. ed. London: Chatham, 2005, 
Online Ressource: Chronik des Seekrieges 1939–1945. Revised edition. Stuttgart: WLB, 2007 ff.
Brill's Encyclopedia of the First World War / ed. by Gerhard Hirschfeld; Gerd Krumeich; Irina Renz. – Leiden : Brill, 2012. –

Secondary literature 
 100 Jahre Bibliothek für Zeitgeschichte: 1915 – 2015 / Christian Westerhoff (ed.). – Stuttgart, Württembergische Landesbibliothek, 2015, 
 1914 – 1918, Orages de papier : les collections de guerre des bibliothèques / ed. by Christophe Didier; Christian Baechler. – Paris : Somogy, Éd. d'Art; Strasbourg: BNU, Bibl. Nat. Univ., 2008,

References

External links 
 
 Poster database of the Library of Contemporary History
 Digitized books of the Library of Contemporary History
 100 Jahre Erster Weltkrieg – 100 Jahre Bibliothek für Zeitgeschichte

Libraries in Stuttgart
Military historiography
Libraries established in 1915
1915 establishments in Germany